The 2022 Engie Open de Seine-et-Marne was a professional tennis tournament played on indoor hard courts. It was the eighth edition of the tournament which was part of the 2022 ITF Women's World Tennis Tour. It took place in Croissy-Beaubourg, France between 28 March and 3 April 2022.

Singles main draw entrants

Seeds

 1 Rankings are as of 21 March 2022.

Other entrants
The following players received wildcards into the singles main draw:
  Audrey Albié
  Manon Léonard
  Mallaurie Noël
  Marine Partaud

The following players received entry from the qualifying draw:
  Darya Astakhova
  Mona Barthel
  Flavie Brugnone
  Berfu Cengiz
  Celia Cerviño Ruiz
  Léolia Jeanjean
  Lu Jingjing
  Yana Morderger

The following player received entry as a lucky loser:
  Martina Di Giuseppe

Champions

Singles

  Linda Nosková def.  Léolia Jeanjean, 6–3, 6–4

Doubles

  Isabelle Haverlag /  Justina Mikulskytė def.  Sofya Lansere /  Oksana Selekhmeteva, 6–4, 6–2

References

External links
 2022 Engie Open de Seine-et-Marne at ITFtennis.com
 Official website

2022 ITF Women's World Tennis Tour
2022 in French tennis
March 2022 sports events in France
April 2022 sports events in France